José Certeza Locsín (August 27, 1891 – May 1, 1977) was a Philippine medical doctor and senator.

Early life and education
Locsín was born on August 27, 1891 in Silay, Negros Occidental. He was the third child of Domingo Locsín and Enriqueta Corteza. His family, who was originally from Molo, Iloilo, was among the most prominent when they settled in Silay. They acquired lands and engaged in sugarcane farming. They were devout Roman Catholics.

Locsín finished his primary education in Silay. Thereafter, his parents sent him to Manila to study, first at Liceo de Manila and afterwards at the Universidad de Santo Tomas, where he graduated with the degree of Doctor of Medicine, receiving the honor “Meritissimus.”

Medical practice 
He started his medical profession in Silay, where he established the Maternity and Children’s Hospital which later became the Silay General Hospital. He was also responsible for the establishment of a Rest and Resettlement Center for Tuberculosis in Patag, Silay’s mountain barangay. He also organized several women's clubs to run puericulture centers. Apart from his initiatives in Silay, he was also responsible for the establishment of the Negros Occidental Provincial Hospital and later its School of Nursing.

Political career 
Although Locsín was a doctor by profession, he inclined to politics. Due to his service to the people of Silay, he was elected as Municipal Councilor when he first decided to run for public office. After that, he was elected as provincial member of Negros Occidental. In 1925, he became Governor of Negros Occidental. In his three years as governor, he focused on building roads and bridges throughout the province further establishing a waterworks system. Along with the Provincial Board, he initiated the development of the provincial government building. He also placed a high priority on improving the province’s educational system and for having had more schools built during his term than all the governors before him combined.

After his term as governor, he ran for Congress and was elected representative of the first district of Negros Occidental in 1928. As a representative of a district whose primary means of livelihood depend upon the sugar industry, he worked for the modernization of sugar centrals, increasing the share of sugarcane planters within the sugar produced, and raising the wages of farm laborers. As Chairman of the Committee on Public Instruction, he worked on the establishment of faculties in remote barrios and well plazas in towns to market cultural events.

In 1935, he became a delegate to the Constitutional Convention. One of his outstanding contributions as a delegate to the convention was the inclusion of social justice within the Constitution’s declaration of principles. Dr. Locsín was a member of the Nacionalista Party, and a fanatical advocate of its principles, and a loyal supporter of its members. When Ferdinand Marcos switched allegiance and ran for president in 1965 under Nationalista, he supported Marcos’ candidacy, being members of the said party. But when Marcos declared martial law in 1972, he was disheartened and regretted having given his support to Marcos’ presidency. Although he was no longer active in politics during the time of Martial Law, Dr. Locsín wore a black ribbon as a sign of protest against Marcos. Even on his deathbed, he wore with him the black ribbon symbolizing his mourning of the death of democracy.

At the Senate 
Locsín was the first post-war cabinet member under President Sergio Osmena in 1945 to 1946, serving as Secretary of the Department of Health and Public Welfare to help people recuperate from the ravages of World War II. From 1951 to 1957, he served the country as a senator and dedicated himself to addressing a wide range of issues. As Chairman of the Health Committee, he worked for the approval of various measures to ensure and promote the health and safety of people through the establishment of Rural Health Units, the standardization of hospital services, and the National Campaign Against Tuberculosis. In addition, he also secured appropriations for the construction of new hospitals, health centers, clinics and other health care facilities. At the same time, he also worked for the improvement of salary levels of public health care personnel, especially doctors. As Chairman of the Committee on Accounts, he strived to maintain the annual appropriation in order to prevent any deficiency during his term. His other achievements as a Senator include sponsorship of the Rural Banks Act; authorship of the Flag Ceremony Law which gave importance to recognizing and respecting the Philippine flag; increase of the salary of public school teachers; and passage of a measure to celebrate the centennial of the birth of Dr. Jose Rizal in an appropriate manner. Senator Locsín was a member of the Philippine economic mission headed by Senator Laurel which worked for the Laurel-Langley Trade Agreement of 1945.

The Filipino First Policy 
Perhaps the greatest contribution of Locsín to the upliftment of the Filipino people is his authorship of the bill popularly known as the “Filipino First Policy” during his term as Chairman of the National Economic Council (NEC, now the National Economic and Development Authority, or NEDA) from 1958 to 1961. As an effect of the Filipino First Policy, agro-industrial development was given impetus and encouragement. This resulted in the establishment of more cement factories, flour mills, and FILOIL–the first of the Filipino-owned gasoline companies. It also led to the banning of importation of plywood, the financing of irrigation and fertilizer programs, and the construction of artesian wells and hydro-electric power plants in different parts of the Philippines. Another major result was the development of new industries through the Industrial Dispersal Program, and the program for social and economic development of the Mindanao Region.

At the same time that he was Chairman of NEC, he headed the National Productivity Board of the Philippines. As such, he contributed to the establishment of the Asian Productivity Organization (APO) of which he was unanimously elected its first Chairman in May 1961 during its inaugural meeting in Tokyo, Japan, an honour not only to himself but to the Philippines which he represented. When his term as NEC Chairman ended in 1961, he was appointed as Acting Secretary of the Department of Agriculture and Natural Resources. During this short assignment, he had the licensing of forest concessions investigated which led to a marked reduction in the granting of such licenses and the filing of legal cases against illegal logging in the country.

Legacy 
In 1974, Locsín suffered a stroke which some people say was brought about by his frustration with not being able to directly do anything about abolishing Martial Law. From then on, he underwent several surgical procedures due to problems with his gallbladder and prostate. Because of complications brought about by old age and his illnesses, he became bedridden in 1976. On May 1, 1977, he died at the age of 88. He left a legacy of dedicated and principled public service. Before his death, it was proposed that the city of Silay be renamed after him, but he refused. After his death, the hospital in Silay was renamed after him in honor and gratitude for his service to the Silaynons. The Rizal Cultural and Civic Center in his hometown, Silay was also built in his honor and named after him. However, in spite of these recognitions, many of the younger Silaynons do not know who he really was and what he had accomplished. Recently, the Dr. Jose C. Locsín Memorial Provincial Hospital, which he had established, was closed down and all its services were transferred to the new Teresita L. Jalandoni Provincial Hospital.

Personal life
He married Salvacion Montelibano and had eighteen children. One of his sons died of typhoid at the age of four. He experienced another loss in 1959 when his wife died of cardiac arrest at the age of 61. In 1962, at the age of 70, he remarried. His second wife, Delia Ediltrudes Santiago, a social worker from Bacolod, bore him a son and a daughter.

Notes

References

External links
Official Senate site

Senators of the 3rd Congress of the Philippines
Senators of the 2nd Congress of the Philippines
Secretaries of Agriculture of the Philippines
Secretaries of Environment and Natural Resources of the Philippines
Secretaries of Health of the Philippines
Secretaries of Social Welfare and Development of the Philippines
People from Silay
Governors of Negros Occidental
Nacionalista Party politicians
20th-century Filipino medical doctors
1891 births
1977 deaths
Osmeña administration cabinet members
Garcia administration cabinet members
Macapagal administration cabinet members
University of Santo Tomas alumni
Members of the Philippine Legislature
Members of the House of Representatives of the Philippines from Negros Occidental
Visayan people